Tazomeline (LY-287,041) is a drug which acts as a non-selective muscarinic acetylcholine receptor agonist. It was in clinical trials for the treatment of cognitive dysfunction such as that seen in Alzheimer's disease and schizophrenia, but development was apparently scrapped for unknown reasons. Another of the patented uses is for the treatment of "severe painful conditions".

Synthesis
 

: A Strecker type alpha-amino nitrile between nicotinaldehyde, potassium cyanide and ammonium chloride gives amino(pyridin-3-yl)acetonitrile [131988-63-1] (2). The halogenation of this intermediate with sulfur monochloride [10025-67-9] in DMF led to 3-chloro-4-(3-pyridyl)-1,2,5-thiadiazole [131986-28-2] (3).

: Thioether formation with 1-Hexanethiol [111-31-9] (4) in the presence of sodium hydrogen sulfide, DMF and K2CO3 gave 3-(4-hexylthio-1,2,5-thiadiazol-3-yl)pyridine, CID:10755149 (5). Alkylation with methyl iodide gives 3-(4-hexylthio-1,2,5-thiadiazol-3-yl)-1-methylpyridinium iodide, CID:19075299 (6). The reduction of the pyridine with sodium borohydride in alcohol gives the tetrahydropyridine and hence completed the synthesis of Tazomeline (7).

See also 
 Alvameline
 Milameline
 Sabcomeline
 Xanomeline

References 

Muscarinic agonists
Tetrahydropyridines
Thiadiazoles